Looking for Christmas is the sixth studio album by American country music singer Clint Black. The album was released on October 17, 1995. His first album of Christmas music, it features the song "'Til Santa's Gone (Milk and Cookies)". This song charted on several occasions on the Hot Country Songs charts, reaching as high as #34 based on Christmas airplay.

Track listing

Personnel
Sam Bacco - percussion
Eddie Bayers - drums
Clint Black - harmonica, lead vocals
Robbie Buchanan - keyboards, piano
Jerry Douglas - dobro
Stuart Duncan - fiddle
Pat Enright - acoustic guitar
Dick Gay - drums
Warren Hill - saxophone
Dann Huff - electric guitar
Ronn Huff - string conductor
Jeff Huskins - fiddle
Sam Levine - recorder
Gene Libbea - bass flute
The London Session Orchestra - strings
Hayden Nicholas - acoustic guitar
Alan O'Bryant - banjo
Jeff Peterson - steel guitar
Tom Roady - percussion
John Robinson - drums
Leland Sklar - bass guitar
Fred Tackett - acoustic guitar
George Tidwell - flugelhorn
Cindy Richardson Walker - background vocals
Roland White - mandolin
Jake Willemain - bass guitar
Curtis Young - background vocals

Chart performance

Album

Singles

AReleased as "'Til Santa's Gone (I Just Can't Wait)"

References 

Black Tracks: Looking for Christmas. ClintBlack.com. Retrieved on November 7, 2007.
[ Artist Chart History (Singles)]. Billboard. Retrieved on November 7, 2007.
[ Artist Chart History (Albums)]. Billboard. Retrieved on November 7, 2007.

1995 Christmas albums
Christmas albums by American artists
Country Christmas albums
Clint Black albums
RCA Records Christmas albums
Albums produced by James Stroud